Nicholas Ilkov (Polish: Mikołaj Ilków, Ukrainian:  Mikola Іlkіv, born on 10 December 1890 - died in 1940, Katyn) was a Ukrainian Greek Catholic priest.

Biography

Ilkov was born on 10 December 1890 in a peasant family in Kalush Raion, Ukraine, being of Orthodox religion. In 1919, after graduating from the seminary, ordained a Catholic priest of the Byzantine rite. From 1927 Ilkov served in the Diocese of Lviv, and in 1939 became a chaplain with the rank of major general and military administrator of the parish in Łódź. After the outbreak of World War II he was in eastern Poland. In 1939, he was arrested and became a prisoner of war in Starobelsk and Kozielsku camps. In 1940, Ilkov was shot in Katyn.

References

External links
 http://grekokatolicy.pl/aktualnosci/70.-rocznica-zbrodni-katynskiej-nasi-duchowni-zamordowani-w-katyniu..html?atrGrp=movies&atrId=1696&rating=80
 http://www.catholic.ru/modules.php?name=Encyclopedia&op=content&tid=5637
 http://www.ogrodywspomnien.pl/index/showd/6087

Converts to Eastern Catholicism from Eastern Orthodoxy
Ukrainian Eastern Catholic priests
Former Ukrainian Orthodox Christians
1890 births
1940 deaths
Ukrainian people executed by the Soviet Union
Catholic people executed by the Soviet Union
People from Ivano-Frankivsk Oblast
People from the Kingdom of Galicia and Lodomeria
Ukrainian Austro-Hungarians
Ukrainian politicians before 1991
Members of the Sejm of the Second Polish Republic (1922–1927)
Executed Ukrainian people
Katyn massacre victims
Recipients of the Silver Cross of Merit (Poland)
Recipients of the Gold Cross of Merit (Poland)